James Huey Walkup (November 3, 1895 – June 12, 1990) was a Major League Baseball pitcher. He batted right-handed and threw left-handed.

Walkup was born in Havana, Arkansas, and died in Duncan, Oklahoma.

External links 

 

1895 births
1990 deaths
Baseball players from Arkansas
Beaumont Exporters players
Birmingham Barons players
Detroit Tigers players
Fort Worth Cats players
Fort Worth Panthers players
Joplin Miners players
Major League Baseball pitchers
Minor league baseball managers
Newark Bears (IL) players
Okmulgee Drillers players
People from Yell County, Arkansas
Tulsa Oilers (baseball) players
Ennis Tigers players